Mr. President is an American sitcom created by Johnny Carson's company, Carson Productions, that starred George C. Scott and premiered on May 3, 1987. It was part of the Fox Broadcasting Company's premiere season of prime time entertainment, alongside Married... with Children, The Tracey Ullman Show, and Duet.

Plot
The series centered around newly elected President Samuel Arthur Tresch, the former governor of Wisconsin. Others in the cast were Meg Tresch, Samuel's wife, who left him at the start of the second season, and Samuel's children, 16-year-old Cynthia and 12-year-old Nick. Charlie Ross was the Chief of Staff.

Cast
George C. Scott ...  President Samuel Arthur Tresch
Conrad Bain ...  Charlie Ross, the President's Chief of Staff
Carlin Glynn ...  First Lady Meg Tresch; she leaves the President at the beginning of the second season
Maddie Corman ...  Cynthia Tresch, the President's youngest daughter
 Susan Wheeler Duff ... Jennifer, the President's eldest daughter (married)
Andre Gower ...  Nick Tresch, the President's son
Madeline Kahn ...  Lois Gullickson, the President's sister-in-law; after the President's wife leaves him, she moves into the White House to help care for the children
Earl Boen ... Dave
Allen Williams ... Daniel Cummings

Episode list

Season 1 (1987)

Season 2 (1987–1988)

References

External links
 

1987 American television series debuts
1988 American television series endings
1980s American sitcoms
Fox Broadcasting Company original programming
1980s American political comedy television series
Television shows set in Washington, D.C.
Television series by Universal Television
Television series by Carson Productions
Television series created by Ed. Weinberger